The 1995–96 Serie A title was won by Milan (15th title for the Milan-based club), with Juventus finishing as runners-up. Fourth placed Fiorentina tasted glory in the Coppa Italia, while seventh-placed Internazionale only narrowly managed to qualify for the UEFA Cup under the management of their new English head coach Roy Hodgson. In fact Internazionale needed both Fiorentina beating Atalanta in the 1995-96 Coopa Italia Final and their (Internazionales) arch rivals AC Milan and Juventus win the Serie A (Milan) and the 1995-96 UEFA Champions League Final (Juventus). Had one of these three things not occurred Internazionale would have missed out on european football for the second time in four years (having failed to qualify for any of the 1992-93 UEFA club competitions). Bari, Torino, Cremonese and Padova were all relegated.

Teams
Piacenza, Udinese, Vicenza and Atalanta had been promoted from Serie B.

Number of teams by region

Personnel and Sponsoring

League table

Results

Top goalscorers

References and sources

Almanacco Illustrato del Calcio - La Storia 1898-2004, Panini Edizioni, Modena, September 2005

External links
Serie A 1995-96, at It.Wikipedia - with pictures and info
Season results, at RSSSF

Serie A seasons
Italy
1995–96 in Italian football leagues